The New York Earth Room is an interior sculpture by the artist Walter de Maria that has been installed in a loft at 141 Wooster Street in New York City since 1977. The sculpture is a permanent installation of 250 cubic yards (197 cubic meters) of earth in 3,600 (335 square meters) square feet of floor space, and 22 inch depth of material (56 centimeters). The installation has had the same caretaker, Bill Dilworth, since 1989, and is maintained by the Dia Art Foundation who consider it one of their 11 locations and sites they manage.

History
The first 'Earth Room' was the Munich Earth Room, installed in 1968 by Heiner Friedrich at Galerie Heiner Friedrich in Munich. The work was first installed in New York in 1977 as a 3-month exhibition, at what was then the Heiner Friedrich Gallery. It remained on display long afterward, and when Friedrich helped to establish the Dia Art Foundation in 1980, he supported its permanent sponsorship of the New York Earth Room.

Similarly to de Maria's Lightning Field installation, his Broken Kilometer and New York Earth Room installations in New York remain on continuous view.

See also
Land art

Further reading
 De Maria, Walter. 1992. New York Earth Room. Art in America. 
 Kastner, Jeffrey. 2000. "Alone in a Crowd: The Solitude of Walter de Maria's New York Earth Room and Broken Kilometer". Afterall: A Journal of Art, Context, and Enquiry. (2): 69-73.
 Lailach, Michael, and Uta Grosenick. 2007. Land Art. Köln: Taschen. . 
 Cascone, Sarah. "Walter de Maria, 1935-2013." Art in America.

References

External links
 Interview with Bill Dilworth

1977 works
1977 establishments in New York City
Land art
Art museums and galleries in Manhattan
SoHo, Manhattan